In physics, in the context of electromagnetism, Birkhoff's theorem concerns spherically symmetric static solutions of Maxwell's field equations of electromagnetism.

The theorem is due to George D. Birkhoff.  It states that any spherically symmetric solution of the source-free Maxwell equations is necessarily static. Pappas (1984) gives two proofs of this theorem, using Maxwell's equations and Lie derivatives. It is a limiting case of Birkhoff's theorem (relativity) by taking the flat metric without backreaction.

Derivation from Maxwell's equations 
The source-free Maxwell's equations state that

Since the fields are spherically symmetric, they depend only on the radial distance in spherical coordinates. The field is purely radial as non-radial components cannot be invariant under rotation, which would be necessary for symmetry. Therefore, we can rewrite the fields as

We find that the curls must be zero, since,

Moreover, we can substitute into the source-free Maxwell equations, to find that

Simply dividing by the constant coefficients, we find that both the magnetic and electric field are static

Derivation using Lie derivatives 

Using the Hodge star operator, we can rewrite Maxwell's Equations with these forms as

.

By the definition of the Lie derivative as the directional derivative along 

.

Therefore,  is equivalent to  under rotation and we can write for some function 

.

Because the product of the components of the vector are just its length

.

And substituting back into our equation and rewriting for a function 

.

.

And using our Maxwell equation that ,

.

Thus, we find that the magnetic field is static. Similarly, using the second rotational invariance equation, we can find that the electric field is static. Therefore, the solution must be static.

References 

Electrodynamics
Physics theorems